Callochiton is a genus of chitons in the family Callochitonidae.

Species
 Callochiton crocinus (Reeve, 1847)
 Callochiton dentatus Spengler, 1797
 Callochiton empleurus (Hutton, 1872)
 Callochiton kapitiensis Mestayer, 1926      
 Callochiton laevis
 Callochiton mortenseni Odhner, 1924
 Callochiton puniceus (Gould, 1846)         
 Callochiton septemvalvis (Montagu, 1803)
 Callochiton subeudoxa (Iredale and Hull, 1930  
 Callochiton sulculatus Suter, 1907

References

 
 Powell A. W. B., New Zealand Mollusca, William Collins Publishers Ltd, Auckland, New Zealand 1979 
  Iredale, T. & Hull, A. F. B. (1929). The loricates of the neozelanic region. Australian Zoologist 6: 75-95. 
 Vaught, K.C.; Tucker Abbott, R.; Boss, K.J. (1989). A classification of the living Mollusca. American Malacologists: Melbourne. ISBN 0-915826-22-4. XII, 195 pp
 Liu, J.Y. [Ruiyu] (ed.). (2008). Checklist of marine biota of China seas. China Science Press. 1267 pp.

External links
 Gray, J. E. (1847). Additional observations on Chitones. Proceedings of the Zoological Society of London. (1847) 15 (178): 126-127
 Cotton, B. C. & Weeding, B. J. (1939). Flindersian Loricates. Transactions of the Royal Society of South Australia. 63(2): 180-199
 Ashby, E. & Cotton, B. C. (1939). New fossil chitons from the Miocene and Pliocene of Victoria. Records of the South Australian Museum. 6(3): 209–242, pls. 19–21

Callochitonidae
Extant Oligocene first appearances
Chiton genera